Anne Brinch-Nielsen (born 3 May 1997) is a Danish handball player who currently plays for EH Aalborg.

Achievements
Danish Handball Cup:
Winner: 2017

References

External links
 DHDb - Anne Brinch-Nielsen 

1994 births
Living people
Sportspeople from Aarhus
Danish female handball players